The Central District of Kashmar County is a district (bakhsh) in Kashmar County, Razavi Khorasan Province, Iran. At the 2006 census, its population was 119,507, in 32,143 families.  The district has one city: Kashmar.  The district has two rural districts (dehestan): Bala Velayat Rural District and Pain Velayat Rural District.

References 

Districts of Razavi Khorasan Province
Kashmar County